The 1919 Massachusetts Aggies football team represented Massachusetts Agricultural College in the 1919 college football season. The team was coached by Harold Gore and played its home games at Alumni Field in Amherst, Massachusetts. The 1919 season was Gore's first as head coach of the Aggies and the team's first season since disbanding during World War I. Massachusetts finished the season with a record of 5–2–1.

Schedule

References

Massachusetts
UMass Minutemen football seasons
Massachusetts Aggies football